Agrotis margelanoides is a moth of the family Noctuidae. It is only known from the Levant, Iraq, Saudi Arabia and Bahrain.

Adults are on wing in autumn. There is one generation per year.

External links
 Noctuinae of Israel

Agrotis
Moths of the Middle East
Moths described in 1944